Bjørn Slettan (born 11 October 1931) is a Norwegian historian. He comes from Holum, Norway. He first took a teacher's education in Kristiansand, and later the cand.philol. degree in history at the University of Oslo. He worked as a teacher for many years, but in 1991 he was appointed as an associate professor at Agder University College, as the first faculty member in history at that institution. He retired in 1998. His main work was the third volume of the history of Mandal city, published in 2006.

References

1931 births
Living people
20th-century Norwegian historians
University of Oslo alumni
Academic staff of the University of Agder
People from Mandal, Norway
21st-century Norwegian historians